Mate is a Croatian given name, a variant of Matthew. Notable people with the name include:

 Mate Balota (1898–1963), Croatian poet, novelist and economist
 Mate Baturina (born 1973), Croatian football striker
 Mate Bilić (born 1980), Croatian football striker
 Mate Boban (1940−1997), Croatian politician
 Mate Brajković (born 1981), Croatian football striker
 Mate Bulić (born 1957), Croatian pop and folk singer
 Mate Delić (born 1993), Croatian tennis player
 Mate Dragičević (born 1979), Croatian football striker
 Mate Dugandžić (born 1989), Australian soccer player
 Mate Dujilo (born 1982), Croatian football defender
 Mate Eterović (born 1984), Croatian football forward
 Mate Ghvinianidze (born 1986), Georgian football defender
 Mate Granić (born 1947), Croatian diplomat and politician
 Mate Jakich (1940–2010), New Zealand rugby union player
 Mate Lacić (born 1980), Croatian football defender
 Mate Mahadevi (born 1946), Indian scholar and mystic
 Mate Maleš (born 1989), Croatian football midfielder
 Mate Maras (born 1933), Croatian translator
 Mate Mezulić (born 1981), Croatian bobsledder
 Mate Meštrović (born 1930), Croatian-American journalist and politician
 Mate Pavić (born 1993), Croatian tennis player
 Mate Parlov (1948–2008), Croatian boxer
 Mate Šestan (born 1971), Croatian footballer
 Mate Trojanović (1930–2015), Croatian rower
 Mate Ujević (1901–1967), Croatian writer
 Mate Vatsadze (born 1988), Georgian football forward

See also
Mate (disambiguation)
 Matej
 Matea

References

Croatian masculine given names